Lilium kelleyanum is a California species of lily known by the common name Kelley's lily. It grows primarily in wetlands in the Sierra Nevada as well as in the Coast Ranges and southern Cascades in the northern part of the state.

Description
Lilium kelleyanum is a perennial herb known to exceed two meters in height. The inflorescence bears up to 25 large, nodding lily flowers. The flowers are pollinated by swallowtails.

References

External links
Jepson Manual Treatment:  Lilium kelleyanum
United States Department of Agriculture Plants Profile: Lilium kelleyanum
Calphotos Lilium kelleyanum Photo gallery

kelleyanum
Endemic flora of California
Plants described in 1903
Flora without expected TNC conservation status